Arion Lemesou was a Cypriot football club based in Limassol. Founded in 1956. The team was playing 5 seasons in Second Division. In September 1970 merged with Apollon Limassol keeping the name Apollon.

References

Association football clubs disestablished in 1970
Defunct football clubs in Cyprus
1970 disestablishments in Cyprus